KSBZ (103.1 FM, "Mix 103", formerly classic rock "Rock 103"/alternatively known as "The Rock") is an American radio station licensed to serve the community of Sitka, Alaska. The station, established in 1990, is currently owned by Alaska Broadcast Communications, Inc.

Programming
KSBZ broadcasts a hot adult contemporary music format to the Metro Sitka area. Some programming on the station had derived from Cumulus Media's "Classic Rock" radio network, in its "Rock 103" days. Since the station re-branded as "Mix 103," the syndicated programming and playlist have become identical to that of its Juneau counterpart Mix 106.

History
After applying in July 1989, this station received its original construction permit from the Federal Communications Commission on October 5, 1990. The new station was assigned the KSBZ call sign by the FCC on October 17, 1990.

On October 18, 1990, KSBZ launched with a classic rock and contemporary hit radio format. KSBZ received its license to cover from the FCC on October 21, 1991.

In November 1994, license holder Sitka Broadcasting Company, Inc., reached an agreement to sell this station to Alaska Broadcast Communications, Inc. The deal was approved by the FCC on December 7, 1994, and the transaction was consummated on December 31, 1994.

In January 2000, KSBZ switched to a country music format. In 2006, KSBZ switched formats again, this time to an active rock format, before finally settling on a classic rock format a year later. In January 2020, KIFW transferred all its Adult Contemporary programming over to KSBZ which relaunched as a Hot AC radio station, rebranding as "Mix 103"; KIFW meanwhile inherited the former Classic rock programming once heard over on KSBZ during its "Rock 103"/"The Rock" days as Classic Hits, continuing to be known on-air as The Sound of Sitka.

Former logo

References

External links

SBZ
Hot adult contemporary radio stations in the United States
Radio stations established in 1990
Sitka, Alaska